Khaira may refer to:
 Khaira (surname), including a list of people with the name
 Khaira, Nepal, a town in Pyuthan, Nepal
 Khaira, Palghar, a town in Maharashtra, India
 Khaira, Delhi, an urban village in Delhi, India
 Khaira, Ludhiana, a village in Punjab, India
 Khaira, Raebareli, a village in Uttar Pradesh, India

See also